Hypsitherium is an extinct genus of Mesotheriidae that lived 4.0 to 3 million years ago, and is known from the Miocene to Pliocene Inchasi fossil locality in Bolivia. It was a scansorial herbivore, with its name meaning "high beast."

References

Further reading 
 B. J. MacFadden, F. Anaya, and J. Argollo. 1993. Magnetic polarity stratigraphy of Inchasi: a Pliocene mammal-bearing locality from the Bolivian Andes deposited just before the Great American Interchange. Earth and Planetary Science Letters 114(2-3):229-241

Typotheres
Prehistoric placental genera
Miocene mammals of South America
Pliocene mammals of South America
Chapadmalalan
Neogene Bolivia
Fossils of Bolivia
Fossil taxa described in 1995